Angeville is a commune in the Tarn-et-Garonne department in the Occitania region in southern France.

Geography
The commune lies on the Sère.

Demography
Residents are called Angevillois in French.

See also
Communes of the Tarn-et-Garonne department

References

Communes of Tarn-et-Garonne